Luigi Malerba (11 November 1927 – 8 May 2008), born Luigi Bonardi, was an Italian author of short stories, historical novels, and screenplays. He has been part of the Neoavanguardia and co-founded Gruppo 63, a literary movement inspired by Marxism and Structuralism. Some of his most famous novels are La scoperta dell'alfabeto, The serpent, What Is This Buzzing, Do You Hear It Too?, Dopo il pescecane, Testa d'argento, Il fuoco greco, Le pietre volanti, Roman ghosts and Ithaca Forever: Penelope speaks. He wrote several stories and novels for kids, some of them in collaboration with Tonino Guerra.

He was the first writer to win the Prix Médicis étranger in 1970. His name popped up among the candidates to the Nobel prize for literature in 2000.

The memory 
"An amusing writer, Malerba is a curious man: curious about language, history, customs, plots and coincidences in life. Not casually he ventured into novels, linguistic essays, screenplays for cinema and television and children's novels".

Umberto Eco said about him: "Many have associated Malerba with post-modern authors, but this classification is inaccurate. The author of What Is This Buzzing, Do You Hear It Too? is always behaving in a maliciously ironic way, using subterfuges and ambiguities". He was one of the most important exponents of the Italian literary movement called Neoavanguardia, along with Balestrini, Sanguineti, and Manganelli.

Paolo Mauri wrote about him: "Malerba operated within the Neoavanguardia: he liked the idea of turning the old narratives upside down and go for new, experimental solutions. With his novels The serpent and What Is This Buzzing, Do You Hear It Too? he started to play on the thread of paradox, where investigations lead to nothing, heroes born from the writer's mind and made to live on the page only to reveal an unexpected trick and a new, absolutely original language. He would then continue, from novel to novel, constantly renewing his themes and style".

Bibliography

Stories and novels 
La scoperta dell'alfabeto (1963)
Il serpente (1966)
Salto mortale (1968, winner of Prix Médicis)
Il protagonista (1973)
Mozziconi (1975)
Storiette (1977)
Il pataffio (1978)
Le galline pensierose (1980)
Diario di un sognatore (1981)
Storiette tascabili (1984)
Il pianeta azzurro (1986, winner of the winner of the Premio Mondello)
Testa d'argento (1988, winner of Grinzane Cavour Prize)
Il fuoco greco (1990, set in the Byzantine Empire)
Le pietre volanti (1992, winner of the Viareggio Prize and the Premio Feronia-Città di Fiano)
Le maschere (1994)
Itaca per sempre (1997)
Pinocchio con gli stivali
Città e dintorni (essays, 2001)
Il circolo di Granada (2002)
Fantasmi romani (2006)

English translations 
Two of Malerba's books have been translated in English (as of July 2007):
Il serpente as The Serpent
Salto mortale as What Is This Buzzing? Do You Hear It Too?
In addition, another of Malerba's novels, Itaca per sempre, has been translated by Douglas Grant Heise (as Ithaca Forever).

Scenarios 
The Overcoat (1952)
The Beach (1954)
Women and Soldiers (1954)
Catch As Catch Can (1967)
The Girl and the General (1967)
Oh, Grandmother's Dead (1969)

References

Sources

External links 

1927 births
2008 deaths
Writers from the Province of Parma
20th-century Italian novelists
20th-century Italian male writers
20th-century Italian screenwriters
Italian male screenwriters
Gruppo 63
Prix Médicis étranger winners
Viareggio Prize winners
Italian male novelists